Clydau is an electoral ward in Pembrokeshire, Wales. The ward consists of the communities of Boncath and Clydau.

Since 2004 it has been represented by Plaid Cymru councillor Rod Bowen.
 
A ward of Pembrokeshire County Council since 1995 it was previously a ward of the former Preseli Pembrokeshire District Council. The population of this ward taken at the 2011 census was 1,451.

References

Elections in Wales